This is a list of former child actors from the Philippines. For the list of current child actors see List of current child actors from the Philippines.

A

B

C

D

E

F

G

H

I

J

K

L

M

N

O

P

Q

R

S

T 

 Tom Taus

U

V

W

Y

Z

References

Filipino, former
 List
 List
 List
former child actors